Minatec (initially called the Micro and Nanotechnology Innovation Centre) is a research complex specializing in micro-nano technologies in Grenoble, France.

The centre was inaugurated in June 2006 by François Loos, French Minister Delegate for Industry, as a partnership between LETI (the Electronics and Information Technologies Laboratory of CEA, the French Atomic Energy Commission) and by Grenoble Institute of Technology (Université Grenoble Alpes). The site was already home to LETI, Europe's top center for applied research in microelectronics and nanotechnology. Minatec combines a physical research campus with a network of companies, researchers, and engineering schools. It was launched to foster technology transfer, with real-life applications in energy and communications, among others.
 
The complex is home to 3,000 researchers, 1,200 students, and 600 technology transfer experts  on a 20-hectare campus offering 10,000 square meters for cleanroom space. It offers a continuum that goes from student training to technology transfer to industry, through basic and applied research.

The Minatec campus has dedicated special-events facilities (900 m²), ranging from 20-person conference rooms to a 400-seat amphitheater. These spaces are available to researchers for their scientific events such as the international conference Nano safe held every two years since 2008.

Funding 
Minatec represents an investment of 193.5 million euros between 2002 and 2005, mainly paid by local authorities and the CEA.

See also 
Polygone Scientifique

References

External links

Research institutes in France
Microtechnology
Nanotechnology institutions
Educational institutions in Grenoble
Grenoble Institute of Technology
Science and technology in Grenoble
Organizations established in 2006
2006 establishments in France